Shakhuva is a rural locality (a selo) in Kundynsky Selsoviet, Laksky District, Republic of Dagestan, Russia. The population was 44 as of 2010. There are 7 streets.

Geography 
Shakhuva is located 12 km northeast of Kumukh (the district's administrative centre) by road, on the right bank of the Kazikumukshkoye Koysu. Kundy and Kuma are the nearest rural localities.

Nationalities 
Laks live there.

Famous residents 
Mariyan Dandamayeva (performer of Lak folk songs, People's Artist of the Dagestan ASSR)

References 

Rural localities in Laksky District